Nurur Rahman is a politician of Comilla District of Bangladesh and former member of Parliament for Comilla-18 constituency in 18 February 1979. He was a Member of the 2nd National Assembly of Pakistan as a representative of East Pakistan.

Career
Rahman was a Member of the 2nd National Assembly of Pakistan. He joined Bangladesh Nationalist Party and served as its treasurer after the Independence of Bangladesh. He was elected to parliament from Comilla-18 as a Bangladesh Nationalist Party candidate in 1979 Bangladeshi general election.

References

Pakistani MNAs 1955–1958
Living people
Bangladesh Nationalist Party politicians
Year of birth missing (living people)
People from Comilla District
2nd Jatiya Sangsad members
People of East Pakistan